The FIFA World Cup, sometimes called the Football World Cup or the Soccer World Cup, but usually referred to simply as the World Cup, is an international association football competition contested by the men's national teams of the members of Fédération Internationale de Football Association (FIFA), the sport's global governing body. The championship has been awarded every four years since the first tournament in 1930, except in 1942 and 1946, due to World War II.

The tournament consists of two parts, the qualification phase and the final phase (officially called the World Cup Finals). The qualification phase, which currently take place over the three years preceding the Finals, is used to determine which teams qualify for the Finals. The current format of the Finals involves 32 teams competing for the title, at venues within the host nation (or nations) over a period of about a month. The World Cup Finals is the most widely viewed sporting event in the world, with an estimated 715.1 million people watching the 2006 tournament final.

Haiti have appeared in the finals of the FIFA World Cup on one occasion in 1974.

Before Haiti ever qualified for a major soccer tournament, a Haitian player earned some notable World Cup glory. Joe Gaetjens, who had been playing for a New York-based club for several years at the time, represented the United States at the 1950 World Cup and scored the winning goal in a legendary 1–0 victory over England.

Overall record

*Draws include knockout matches decided via penalty shoot-out

By match

Record by opponent

Haiti at the 1974 World Cup

Squad
Head coach: Antoine Tassy

Group 4

Record players

Seven players have been fielded in all three of Haiti's matches at the 1974 World Cup, making them record World Cup players for their country:

Top goalscorers

Both Haitian goals in FIFA World Cup history were scored by Emmanuel Sanon in 1974.

References

 
Countries at the FIFA World Cup